Nothobranchius albimarginatus is a species of fish in the family Aplocheilidae. It is endemic to Tanzania.  Its natural habitats are intermittent rivers and shrub-dominated wetlands. It has only been recorded from two pools on the road between Dar es Salaam and Ikwiriri,  half a kilometre south of the Lukwale River, these pools being the type locality.

Sources

Links
 Nothobranchius albimarginatus on WildNothos - various information and photographs of this species

albimarginatus
Fish described in 1998
Fish of Tanzania
Endemic fauna of Tanzania
Taxonomy articles created by Polbot